The 2016–17 Quinnipiac Bobcats men's basketball team represented Quinnipiac University during the 2016–17 NCAA Division I men's basketball season. The Bobcats, led by 10th year head coach Tom Moore, played their home games at the TD Bank Sports Center in Hamden, Connecticut as members of the Metro Atlantic Athletic Conference. They finished the season 10–21, 7–13 in MAAC play to finish in eighth place. They lost in the first round of the MAAC tournament to Niagara.

On March 7, 2017, head coach Tom Moore was fired. He finished at Quinnipiac with a ten year record of 162–146. On March 27, Villanova assistant coach Baker Dunleavy was hired as the Bobcats next head coach.

Previous season
The Bobcats finished the 2015–16 season 9–21, 6–14 in MAAC play to finish in ninth place. They lost in the first round of the MAAC tournament to Rider.

Roster

Schedule and results

|-
!colspan=9 style=| Regular season

|-
!colspan=9 style=| MAAC tournament

References

Quinnipiac Bobcats men's basketball seasons
Quinnipiac
Quinnipiac Bobcats
Quinnipiac Bobcats